Andrews Field may refer to:
Joint Base Andrews in the US
Andrews Air Force Base, within Joint Base Andrews
RAF Andrews Field in England
Andrews Field (baseball), a baseball stadium in Brandon, Manitoba, Canada
Andrews Field (Norwalk, Connecticut), a sports facility in Norwalk, Connecticut